The Socialist Party of North Dakota was the semi-autonomous affiliate of the Socialist Party of America established in 1902 in the state of North Dakota. The organization had roots in a socialist club founded by Norwegian immigrants in Fargo in 1900. One of the party's professional organizers, a former farmer named Arthur C. Townley, abandoned the group in 1915 to establish a new organization called the Non-Partisan League.    The rapid growth of this organization spelled the demise of the official Socialist organization in the state.

Organizational history

Forerunners
The first organized socialist group in North Dakota was a socialist club started by Arthur Basset in the town of Fargo, located just across the Minnesota border. A considerable number of Scandinavian immigrants had settled in the Upper Midwest, often bringing with them cooperative traditions from the old country. This was particularly true of the Norwegian community which congregated in the Red River Valley in the Eastern part of the state. This Fargo club would provide the initial core of the Socialist Party organization in the state of North Dakota.

Establishment

The Socialist Party of America was established at a convention held in Indianapolis, Indiana in August 1901. The group made its initial national headquarters in Omaha, Nebraska and maintained a physical presence in the American Midwest. Two leaders of the Fargo socialist club — Basset and a young lawyer named Arthur LeSeuer — decided to establish a North Dakota state organization of the new political party. This organization was formally launched in 1902.

After a slow initial phase, the Socialist Party of North Dakota began to show substantial growth as the second decade of the 20th century began. In 1911 LeSeuer was elected president of the City Commission in the town of Minot, located in the North Central part of the state. This victory made LeSeuer the most widely recognized face of the Socialist Party of North Dakota and helped to make the town the center of the party's activity. The North Dakota Socialist Party grew rapidly, touting 175 party locals and branches by 1912.

The Socialist Party of North Dakota maintained its own press, publishing a weekly newspaper called The Iconoclast in Minot from 1912. The organization also ran a full slate of candidates, garnering about 8 percent of the vote statewide in the election of 1912, the peak year of the party's existence.

The rise of Townley
A moderate, electorally-oriented faction controlled the Socialist Party of North Dakota throughout its existence. This group sought to appeal to the farmers of the state, putting together a program which would win their electoral support. Radical socialist ideas such as the collectivization of land were cast aside in favor of more modest economic reforms such as the establishment of state-owned grain elevators and flour mills and state-sponsored agricultural insurance to protect against natural catastrophes.

In 1913 Henry G. Teigan was elected State Secretary of the Socialist Party of North Dakota. Teigan sought to greatly expand the party's size and influence through a concentrated grassroots recruiting effort targeted in the rural western part of the state. Teigan hired a paid organizer for this task, Arthur C. Townley, a formerly prosperous flax farmer who had seen his substantial operation located on the Western border of the state near the town of Beach wiped out in 1912 by early winter weather and falling commodity prices. Townley set out on his organizing efforts late in 1913 but met with resistance among the farmers he approached, who supported the various economic ideas put forward by the Socialist Party but who refused to support that organization itself.

The following year Townley greatly expanded his efforts as a professional party organizer, establishing what the called the "Organization Department." Townley obtained an inexpensive Ford automobile from friends and took to the road to meet with farmers, charging them high dues of $1 a month to become a member of the "Organization Department" — omitting mention of the Socialist Party in his appeal. Townley's efforts proved wildly successful and he was soon able to raise enough money to purchase three more automobiles and to put his own organizers in the field.

While Townley expanded and prospered as a professional political organizer, the Socialist Party of North Dakota which ostensibly had employed him was less than enthusiastic. The state party was part of a national organization which charged dues of just 25 cents per month and was forced to function on a fraction of that amount and they objected to Townley's increasingly rogue political operation. The Socialist Party of North Dakota disavowed Townley's efforts and on December 15, 1914 when he and his trio of organizing associated refused to terminate their activities after being ordered to stop, Townley was expelled from the Socialist Party.

Demise

Revival

A Socialist Party of North Dakota has a Facebook presence.

See also

 Non-Partisan League
 Socialist Party of Missouri
 Socialist Party of Oklahoma
 Socialist Party of Oregon
 Socialist Party of Washington
 Social-Democratic Party of Wisconsin

Footnotes

SPND average paid memberships 

{| class="wikitable" border="3"
|-
! Year
! Average Paid Membership
! Exempt Members
! National SPA Membership
|-
! align="center" | 1901
| align="center" | 
| align="center" | n/a
| align="center" | 4,759 paid (of 7,629)
|-
! align="center" | 1902
| align="center" | 44
| align="center" | n/a
| align="center" | 9,949
|-
! align="center" | 1903
| align="center" | 
| align="center" | n/a
| align="center" | 15,975
|-
! align="center" | 1904
| align="center" | 
| align="center" | n/a
| align="center" | 20,763
|-
! align="center" | 1905
| align="center" | 
| align="center" | n/a
| align="center" | 23,327
|-
! align="center" | 1906
| align="center" | 
| align="center" | n/a
| align="center" | 26,784
|-
! align="center" | 1907
| align="center" | 
| align="center" | n/a
| align="center" | 29,270
|-
! align="center" | 1908
| align="center" | 
| align="center" | n/a
| align="center" | 41,751
|-
! align="center" | 1909
| align="center" | 177
| align="center" | n/a
| align="center" | 41,470
|-
! align="center" | 1910
| align="center" | 
| align="center" | n/a
| align="center" | 58,011
|-
! align="center" | 1911
| align="center" | 
| align="center" | n/a
| align="center" | 84,716
|-
! align="center" | 1912
| align="center" | 
| align="center" | n/a
| align="center" | 118,045
|-
! align="center" | 1913
| align="center" | 
| align="center" | 
| align="center" | 95,957
|-
! align="center" | 1914
| align="center" | 
| align="center" | 
| align="center" | 93,579
|-
! align="center" | 1915
| align="center" | 
| align="center" | 
| align="center" | 79,374
|-
! align="center" | 1916
| align="center" | 843
| align="center" | 
| align="center" | 83,284
|-
! align="center" | 1917
| align="center" | 225
| align="center" | 
| align="center" | 80,379
|-
! align="center" | 1918
| align="center" | 182 (first 6 mos.)
| align="center" | 
| align="center" | 82,344
|-
! align="center" | 1919
| align="center" | 
| align="center" | 
| align="center" | 104,822
|-
! align="center" | 1920
| align="center" | 
| align="center" | 
| align="center" | 26,766
|-
! align="center" | 1921
| align="center" | 
| align="center" | 
| align="center" | 13,484
|-
! align="center" | 1922
| align="center" | 
| align="center" | 
| align="center" | 11,019
|-
! align="center" | 1923
| align="center" | 
| align="center" | 
| align="center" | 10,662
|-
! align="center" | 1924
| align="center" | 
| align="center" | 
| align="center" | 10,125
|-
! align="center" | 1925
| align="center" | 
| align="center" | 
| align="center" | 8,558
|-
! align="center" | 1926
| align="center" | 
| align="center" | 
| align="center" | 8,392
|-
! align="center" | 1927
| align="center" | 
| align="center" | 
| align="center" | 7,425
|-
! align="center" | 1928
| align="center" |
| align="center" | 
| align="center" | 7,793
|-
! align="center" | 1929
| align="center" | 
| align="center" | 
| align="center" | 9,560
|-
! align="center" | 1930
| align="center" | 
| align="center" | 
| align="center" | 9,736
|-
! align="center" | 1931
| align="center" | 
| align="center" | 
| align="center" | 10,389
|-
! align="center" | 1932
| align="center" | 
| align="center" | 
| align="center" | 16,863
|-
! align="center" | 1933
| align="center" | 
| align="center" | 
| align="center" | 18,548
|-
! align="center" | 1934
| align="center" | 
| align="center" | 
| align="center" | 20,951
|-
! align="center" | 1935
| align="center" | 
| align="center" | 
| align="center" | 19,121
|-
! align="center" | 1936
| align="center" | 
| align="center" | 
| align="center" | 11,922
|-
|}
 Sources: Carl D. Thompson, "The Rising Tide of Socialism," The Socialist (Columbus, OH), Aug. 12, 1911, pg. 2; St. Louis Labor, Feb. 22, 1902, pg. 5; "Dues Paid Last Year," The Worker, March 22, 1903, pg. 4; Socialist Party Official Bulletin and successors, Executive Secretary state-by-state membership summaries, January issues;"Socialist Party Official Membership Series,' (1932). Report to 1937 Convention, cited in "Socialist Party of America Annual Membership Figures," Early American Marxism website. Adoloph Germer, Report of Executive Secretary to the National Executive Committee: Chicago, Illinois — Aug. 8, 1918, pp. 5-6. "Exempt" members denote those receiving special dispensation from the state office due to unemployment starting 1913. 1909 figure from Socialist Party Official Bulletin, April 1910, pg. 4.

Further reading

 Gilbert W. Cooke, "The North Dakota State Mill and Elevator," Journal of Political Economy, vol. 46, no. 1 (Feb. 1938), pp. 23–51. in JSTOR
 Scott Ellsworth, Origins of the Nonpartisan League. PhD dissertation. Duke University, 1982.
 William C. Pratt, "Rural Radicalism on the Northern Plains, 1912-1950," Montana: The Magazine of Western History, vol. 42, no. 1 (Winter 1992), pp. 42–55.  in JSTOR
 Jackson K. Putnam, The Socialist Party of North Dakota, 1902-1918. MA Thesis, University of North Dakota, 1956.
 Theodore Saloutos, "The Rise of the Nonpartisan League in North Dakota, 1915-1917," Agricultural History, vol. 20, no. 1 (Jan. 1946), pp. 43–61. in JSTOR

Political parties established in 1901
Political parties in North Dakota
History of North Dakota
Defunct political parties in the United States
North Dakota
State and local socialist parties in the United States